Stomias is a genus of barbeled dragonfishes. They live in the mesopelagic zone of all oceans and show diel vertical migration and sexual dimorphism (males are smaller, have larger eyes and larger postorbital photophores than females.

Species
There are currently nine recognized species in this genus:
 Stomias affinis Günther, 1887 (Günther's boafish)
 Stomias atriventer Garman, 1899 (Black-belly dragonfish)
 Stomias boa (A. Risso, 1810)
 Stomias boa boa (A. Risso, 1810) (Boa dragonfish)
 Stomias boa colubrinus Garman, 1899
 Stomias boa ferox J. C. H. Reinhardt, 1842
 Stomias brevibarbatus Ege, 1918
 Stomias danae Ege, 1933
 Stomias gracilis Garman, 1899
 Stomias lampropeltis Gibbs, 1969
 Stomias longibarbatus (A. B. Brauer, 1902) (Longbarb scaly dragonfish)
 Stomias nebulosus Alcock, 1889 (Alcock's boafish)

References

Stomiidae
Marine fish genera
Taxa named by Georges Cuvier
Ray-finned fish genera